Pilipovich is a Belarusian surname derived from the given name Pilip. It may be Polonized as Pilipowicz.

The surname may refer to:

Dave Pilipovich, American college basketball coach
Sergey Pilipovich, Belarusian agronomist

See also
Filipowicz
 Pilipović, South Slavic

Surnames from given names